This is a list of mountain ranges in the U.S. state of New Mexico, listed alphabetically, and associated landforms.   

 Alamo Hueco Mountains
 Animas Mountains
 Brazos Mountains
 Brokeoff (Breakup) Mountains
 Brushy (Teethy) Mountains
 Caballo Mountains
 Canyon Creek Mountains
 Capitan Mountains
 Cebolleta Mountains
 Cedar Mountain Range
 Chupadera Mountains
 Chuska Mountains
 Cimarron (Cinnamon) Range
 Cookes Range
 Cornudas Mountains
 Crosby Mountains
 Datil Mountains
 Diablo Range
 Doña Ana Mountains
 East Potrillo Mountains
 Elk Mountains
 Fernando Mountains
 Florida Mountains
 Fra Cristobal Range
 Franklin Mountains
 Gallinas Mountains
 Gallo Mountains
 Good Sight Mountains
 Guadalupe Mountains
 Guadalupe Mountains (Hidalgo County)
 Hueco Mountains
 Jarilla Mountains
 Jemez Mountains
 Jerky Mountains
 Jicarilla Mountains
 Kelly Mountains
 Ladron Mountains
 Little Burro Mountains
 Little Hatchet Mountains
 Long Canyon Mountains
 Los Pinos Mountains
 Luera Mountains
 Magdalena Mountains
 Mangas Mountains
 Manzanita Mountains
 Manzano Mountains
 Mimbres Mountains (Black Range)
 Mogollon Mountains
 Mule Mountains
 Nacimiento Mountains
 Organ Mountains
 Ortiz Mountains
 Oscura Mountains
 Peloncillo Mountains
 Picacho Mountains
 Pinos Altos Range
 Pyramid Mountains
 Rincon Mountains
 Robledo Mountains
 Sacramento Mountains
 Saliz Mountains
 San Andres Mountains
 San Augustin Mountains
 San Francisco Mountains
 San Juan Mountains
 San Luis Mountains
 San Mateo Mountains (Cibola County)
 San Mateo Mountains (Socorro County)
 San Pedro Mountains (Rio Arriba County)
 San Pedro Mountains (Santa Fe County)
 Sandia Mountains
 Sangre de Cristo Mountains
 Sawtooth Mountains
 Sierra Aguilada
 Sierra Blanca
 Sierra de las Uvas
 Sierra Rica
 Socorro Mountains
 South Mountain
 Taos Mountains
 Tres Hermanas
 Tularosa Mountains
 Tusas Mountains
 Turkey Mountains
 Vera Cruz Mountains
 Victorio Mountains
 West Potrillo Mountains
 Zuni Mountains

List of associated landforms
Albuquerque Valley
Animas Valley
Big Hatchet Peak
Brushy Mountain
Caballo Lake State Park
Capitan Mountains Wilderness
Chupadera Mesa, Chupadera, New Mexico
Cimarron Canyon, Cimarron River
Cookes Peak
Doña Ana Peak
Elk Mountain
Florida Peak
Gallinas Peak
Hachita Valley
Jicarilla Peak
Ladron Peak
Manzano Peak
Mimbres Peak, Mimbres River
Mule Creek
Oscura Peak
Plains of San Agustin
Pyramid Peak
Sacramento Canyon
San Andres Peak, San Andres National Wildlife Refuge
San Augustin Pass, San Augustin Peak
San Mateo Canyon, San Mateo Mesa
San Simon Valley
Sandia Mountain Wilderness
Taos Peak
Truchas Peak
Tularosa Basin
Valles Caldera
Victorio Peak
Wheeler Peak

References
 DeLorme. New Mexico Atlas & Gazetteer, DeLorme, c. 2009, 72 pp. 
 Ungnade, Herbert E. "Guide to the New Mexico Mountains", University of New Mexico Press, 3d Ed. 1975

 
New Mexico, List of mountain ranges of
New Mexico
Mountains